Clepsis tannuolana is a species of moth of the family Tortricidae. It is found in Russia (Altai Mountains and the mountains of the Tuva Republic). The habitat consists of alpine grass-herb meadows.

References

Moths described in 1973
Clepsis